Tintane  (Arabic:طينطان) is a town and commune in Mauritania. It is located in the Hodh El Gharbi region of Mauritania, and is an important stop on the "Road of Hope", the largest and most important road in Mauritania, which links Nouakchott to Néma.

References

Communes of Mauritania